Muhammad Guruh Irianto Sukarnoputra (born 13 January 1953) is a member of Indonesia's People's Representative Council and an artist. He is the youngest son of Indonesia's first president, Sukarno with his third wife, Fatmawati, and the brother to former Indonesian president Megawati Sukarnoputri.

Guruh attended elementary and high school in Jakarta. He then studied at the Archaeology Faculty at the University of Amsterdam, graduating in 1976. Rather than immediately following in his father's footsteps into politics, he chose a career in the arts, and to date has produced over 100 choreographic works and written popular Indonesian songs. In 1991, he was awarded the Chevalier de L'Ordre des Arts et des Lettres (Knight of the Order of Arts and Letter) by the French government.

He recorded an album called Guruh Gipsy in 1977 with Chrisye.

He entered politics in 1992, becoming a member of the Indonesian legislature, the People's Representative Council, representing the Indonesian Democratic Party (PDI). When the PDI split following a 1996 party congress in Medan, he joined the breakaway Indonesian Democratic Party of Struggle. He was reelected under the banner of the new party in the 1999 Indonesian legislative election and was again re-elected in 2004, 2009, 2014 and 2019. He currently represents the regency of Blitar, East Java.

He has continued to produce artistic performances, such as the opening ceremony of the 2000 Indonesian National Games in Surabaya.

Personal life
In 2002, at age 49, Guruh married for the first time, amid media speculation he was seeking higher political office, possibly even the presidency. His wife was an Uzbek-born Azeri dancer, Guseynova Sabina Padmavati, 26 years his junior. They were married on 20 September 2002 in Tashkent, Uzbekistan, and a wedding ceremony was later held over 19–20 October 2002 in Sriwidjaya Raya, Jakarta. The marriage ended in divorce and Sabina reportedly returned to Uzbekistan.

References
 Daniel Dhaidae (Ed) (2005)Wajah DPR dan DPD 2004-2009 (Faces of the DPR and DPD 2004-2009) Harian Kompas, Jakarta,  (Indonesian)
 Daniel Dhaidae & H. Witdarmono (Eds) (2000)Wajah Dewan Perwakilan Rakyat Republic Indonesia Pemilihan Umum 1999 (Faces of the Republic of Indonesia People's Representative Council 1999 General Election) Harian Kompas, Jakarta,  (Indonesian)
 Yayasan API (2001), Panduan Parlelem Indonesia (Indonesian Parliamentary Guide), Jakarta,  (Indonesian)

Notes

External links
 
Guruh Sukarnoputra at Discogs

People from Jakarta
Indonesian songwriters
Sukarno
Guruh
Indonesian socialites
1953 births
Living people
Members of the People's Representative Council, 1992
Members of the People's Representative Council, 1999
Members of the People's Representative Council, 2004
Members of the People's Representative Council, 2009
Members of the People's Representative Council, 2014
Members of the People's Representative Council, 2019
Indonesian Democratic Party of Struggle politicians
Children of national leaders